Neurotomia coenulentella is a species of moth in the family Pyralidae. It was described by Zeller in 1846. It is found in Spain, Portugal, France, Greece, on Sardinia, Corsica, Malta, Sicily and Algeria.

References

Moths described in 1846
Phycitinae
Moths of Europe